Kishan Shrikanth (born 6 January 1996), professionally known as Kishan SS or Master Kishan, is a film actor and director from Bangalore, Karnataka. , having acted in 24 films and in many popular Indian soap opera (more than 300 episodes), he directed a feature film, C/o Footpath (Care of Footpath), about an orphaned boy who wants to go to school. The film is adapted from a short story written by himself, and the cast includes prominent Indian actors Jackie Shroff, Saurabh Shukla, B. Jayashree, Sudeep and Tara. Kishan himself plays the lead. The film has been dubbed into five major Indian languages and it has also been released in English. It was first shot in Kannada and the original version was released on 26 November 2006.

Kishan counts Arnold Schwarzenegger, Tom Cruise, Keanu Reeves, Jim Carrey, Amitabh Bachchan and many more among his favourite actors.

In November 2006, he was listed as the "youngest director of a professionally made feature length film" by the Guinness Book of World Records (GBWR). He replaces Sydney Ling, who was thirteen in 1973 when he directed the Dutch film Lex the Wonderdog.

Personal life
Kishan Shrikanth was born on 6 January 1996 in Bangalore, India to Shrikanth HR and Shylaja Shrikanth. He has a sister.

Education
Kishan Shrikanth finished his 10th Standard at Camlin English School. He wrote to the government requesting to grant permission to directly take up a Masters Program (Master of Arts in Multimedia & Animation) directly after 10th grade at age of 15. It took him a year to convince various authorities and a technical evaluation was conducted to confirm his eligibility to take up the course. He was admitted into the Masters Program at the age of 16 and went on to become the youngest master's degree earner. He holds an MA in Multimedia.

Films

Care of Footpath
This film involves the story of an orphan slum boy who is adopted by an old lady who finds him on a footpath. She brings him to live with her in the slum. With his friends, he makes a living picking up rags. An encounter with some school students who call him an uneducated brute changes the life of this slum boy. This makes him take up a challenge to get educated. How this boy finds a way to live his dream: going to school to get an education, amidst all odds and evens is the line of the story. Inspired by true life stories of great people like Thomas Alva Edison, Michael Faraday, and India's former president A. P. J. Abdul Kalam, it is a successful film about the life of a young street boy. The film was originally released in Kannada on 26 November 2006. It successfully ran for more than 100 days in Karnataka.

Shroff commented on him saying that "He is such a genius that I had to work in his film. He is constantly thinking about his next shot, constantly innovating to make it better. He is sure about what he wants from his actors".

Filmography

Awards and recognitions

2003 
 Hello Gandhinagara Awards - Best Child Actor for Swathi Muthu 

 2006 

 Golden Lotus National Film Award for Best Children's Film (Care of Footpath) – 54th National Film Awards54th National Film Awards  (PDF) | Directorate of Film Festivals
 Best Film Jury Award (Care of Footpath) – Karnataka State Award
 Best Child Actor (Care of Footpath) – Karnataka State Award
 Opening Film – Kids for Kids International Film Festival, Cyprus

2007

 Telephono Azzuro (Children's Right) – Giffoni International Film Festival, Italy
 Chamber of Deputies Award (the second best film for Care of Footpath) at the Giffoni International Film Festival, Italy
 Children's Rights Award – The Film and Television Association of the Andaman and Nicobar Islands, India
 Closing Film – Busan International Film Festival, South Korea
 Official Selection – Chinh India Film Festival, New Delhi, India
 Official Selection – Mumbai Children's Film Festival

 2008 

 National Child Award for Exceptional Achievement – Government of India
 International Children's Jury Prize – Cairo International Film Festival for Children, Egypt
 International Jury Prize (Adult Jury) – Cairo International Film Festival for Children, Egypt
 Special Honorary Award – Alexandria International Film Festival (Journalist Syndicate, Cairo)
 Best Film Children's Jury Award (Care of Footpath) – 5th International Youth Film Festival (FICI), Spain
 Best Actor Award (Care of Footpath) – 5th International Youth Film Festival (FICI), Spain
 Special Honorary Award – 2nd Emotion Pictures International Festival on Disability-Athens, Greece
 Best Child Actor Silver Elephant Award – 15th Golden Elephant International Children's Film Festival, India
 Special Honorary Award – South India Cinematographers Association-Chennai, India
 Closing Film – Flicks International Film Festival for Children, Saskatoon, CanadaOfficial Selection - 22nd International Festival of Films for Children & Young Adults, (competitive section), Tehran, Iran
 Official Selection – Armenia International Film Festival for the Children, Armenia

2009

 Official Selection & American Premier- SAIFF (South Asian International Film Festival), New York

2012

 Karnataka Government permits to take Post graduation directly after 10th standard. 4th TiE-Aspire Young Achiever Award2014

Kishan enters The Forbes India 30 Under 30 List, the youngest entrepreneur to be recognised by Forbes.

Notes

References
 Meet the director, all of nine years old!, Rediff, 12 January 2006. Accessed 13 January 2006.
 Master Kishan aiming for Guinness Record!, Viggy.com, undated. Accessed 13 January 2006.
 Dean Nelson, Director,  9, calls shots in Bollywood. The Sunday Times (London), 22 January 2006. Accessed 4 February 2006.
 Varuna Verma, Super kids are here, The Telegraph (Calcutta), 2 October 2005. Accessed 13 January 2006.
CBBC Newsround report on Kishan and the shooting of C/O Foothpath. BBC. Accessed 25 January 2006.
Film director, 10,  calls the shots. BBC, 24 January 2006. Accessed 4 February 2006.
 World's youngest director is 9 Rediff Patcy N | 16 January 2006 21:59 IST
 World's youngest director: Kishan NDTV'' 24 March 2008.
 Kishan Shrikanth wins TiE Young Achiever Award "New York Daily News" 22 September 2012.
 IANS, 12-year-old director working on four scripts "DNA India" 17 September 2008.
 Prathibha Joy, Master Kishan in exam mode "Times of India" 6 February 2013.
 Youngest in Forbes' 30 under 30, filmmaker Kishan is raring to go, Times of India. 10 Feb 2014



External links 

 
Kishan Shrikanth on LinkedIn

Kannada film directors
Indian male child actors
Kannada actors
Male actors in Kannada cinema
1996 births
Living people
Film directors from Bangalore
Indian male film actors
Indian film actors
Male actors from Bangalore
Film producers from Bangalore
Kannada film producers
21st-century Indian male child actors
21st-century Indian actors
Directors who won the Best Children's Film National Film Award